In 2010, Pitchfork Media, in their second year of reviewing tracks, including album-only cuts, singles, remixes, a-sides and b-sides of singles and so on,  awarded 97 tracks as Best New Track (BNT) as part of its Best New Music section. The first song to earn this honor in 2010 was the English band Sade's title track of their sixth studio album, Soldier of Love, while the last was "Six Foot Seven Foot" by Lil Wayne featuring Cory Gunz. Pitchfork assigned track reviews numerical scores until the week of their review of Round and Round by Ariel Pink's Haunted Graffiti on March 15, when they renamed their track review section to "The Playlist". If a track was awarded a score of 8+ but was not labeled BNT it will not be included on this list. This list also does not include tracks that were featured on Pitchforks staff lists, but did not receive BNT.

See also
List of albums awarded Pitchfork Best New Album
List of tracks awarded Pitchfork Best New Track in 2009

References

Lists of songs